The Maid of the Oaks is a comedy play by the British playwright and soldier General John Burgoyne, known as Gentleman Johnny. It was originally written in celebration of the forthcoming marriage of Edward Smith-Stanley, heir to the earldom of Derby, and Lady Elizabeth (Betty) Hamilton, daughter of the late James Hamilton, 6th Duke Hamilton and Brandon. Burgoyne was the uncle of the groom and in charge of the lavish masquerade and garden fête, which took place at Lord Stanley's hunting lodge, The Oaks near Epsom, Surrey.

For the event, which took place 9 June 1774, no costs were spared and Burgoyne enlisted the help of two of his close friends, the actor-manager David Garrick and the architect Robert Adam. Garrick had organized the "Music, Vocal Instrumental & Dancing', which was 'perform'd by the Musicians, Singers & Dancers from all the Theatres". The Oaks itself was too small a building to entertain the large number of invited guests, therefore Robert Adam created a temporary "magnificent salon ... illuminated and decorated with the utmost elegance and proportion".  The complex ground plan of this pavilion was published in The Works in Architecture by Robert and James Adam (3 vols., 1773-1822). It shows that the temporary structure contained with 8,200 square feet (762 square meters) the largest room Adam ever built or decorated in his entire career.

Not surprisingly, the lavishness of the celebrations at The Oaks caused a lot of publicity in the papers and magazines of the day. Burgoyne and Garrick decided to capitalize on this by creating a highly profitable stage version, for which the original libretto of the masque was stretched from two to five acts by including additional songs, dances and theatrical interludes to recapture the spirit of the enchanting rural entertainment.
The premiere at Drury Lane Theatre on 5 November 1774 was a triumphant success. The set designs were by the artist Philip James de Loutherbourg. The transparent scenery was lauded by the Westminster Magazine in its review although the critic was not impressed by the play. It was Burgoyne's first work, and he went on to write three further plays following his service in the American War of Independence.

The Oaks, which gave its name to the Oaks Stakes run at the Epsom Downs races each year in early June, was demolished in the 1950s. The gardens and some of the remaining outbuildings form part of Oaks Park (London).

References

Bibliography
 Doderer-Winkler, Melanie. "Magnificent Entertainments: Temporary Architecture for Georgian Festivals".
 Nicoll, Allardyce. A History of English Drama 1660-1900. Volume III: Late Eighteenth Century Drama. Cambridge University Press, 1952.
 Russell, Gillian. Women, Sociability and Theatre in Georgian London. Cambridge University Press, 2007.
 Thomson, Peter. The Cambridge Introduction to English Theatre, 1660-1900. Cambridge University Press, 2006.

Plays by John Burgoyne
1774 plays